Natalie Marie Hagglund (born July 1, 1992) is an American volleyball player.

Career

College
She played indoor volleyball, in the libero position, and beach volleyball for the USC Trojans.

National team
She participated in the 2014 Montreux Volley Masters, 2016 FIVB World Grand Prix.

Club
With her club Voléro Zürich she competed at the 2015 FIVB Volleyball Women's Club World Championship.

References

External links 
 profile, FIVB
 profile, Team USA
 USC Bio

1992 births
Living people
American women's volleyball players
Place of birth missing (living people)
USC Trojans women's volleyball players
USC Trojans women's beach volleyball players
Liberos
American expatriate sportspeople in Switzerland
American expatriate sportspeople in South Korea
Expatriate volleyball players in Switzerland
Expatriate volleyball players in South Korea
Pan American Games gold medalists for the United States
Pan American Games medalists in volleyball
Volleyball players at the 2015 Pan American Games
Medalists at the 2015 Pan American Games